Yamal-402 is a Russian geostationary communications satellite. It was launched on 8 December 2012, 13:13:43 UTC from Site 200/39 at the Baikonur Cosmodrome in Kazakhstan. It was built by Thales Alenia Space, and is based on the Spacebus-4000C3 satellite bus. It is equipped with 46 Ku-band) transponders. It has a design life of 15 years, but reducing to 11 years expected after launch partial failure.

History 
In February 2009, Gazprom Space Systems announced a contract with Thales Alenia Space for two satellites: Yamal-401 and Yamal-402. This was the first time a foreign supplier would build a satellite for the domestic Russian market. After much lobby from Russian industry, the contract for the bus and integration of Yamal-401 was cancelled and awarded to ISS Reshetnev, but Thales was allowed to keep the payload supply.

Launch problem 
On 6 November 2012, the satellite arrives at the launch site of Baikonur. On 8 December 2012, at 13:13:43 UTC, a Proton-M / Briz-M launches Yamal-402 to a geostationary transfer orbit (GTO). The same day, Khrunichev State Research and Production Space Center and International Launch Services (ILS) reported an anomaly during the launch in which the Briz-M stage failed 4 minutes before scheduled shut down on its fourth burn.

On 10 December 2012, specialists from Thales Alenia Space carried out maneuvers to bring the satellite into its designated orbit after a premature separation from Briz-M. On 15 December 2012, Yamal-402 was taken to its planned geostationary orbit at the altitude of 36,000 km following a series of four adjustment operations.

Mission 
The satellite lost 4 years of fuel to compensate for lower than expected orbit injection.

See also 

 Yamal – Communication satellite family operated by Gazprom Space Systems
 Gazprom Space Systems – Satellite communication division of the Russian oil giant Gazprom
 Spacebus (satellite bus) – Satellite platform on which Yamal-402 is based
 Thales Alenia Space – Satellite bus and payload designer and manufacturer

References

External links 
  Gazprom Space Systems Yamal-402 technical performance

Yamal-402
Spacecraft launched in 2012
2012 in Russia
Communications satellites in geostationary orbit
Satellites using the Spacebus bus
Spacecraft launched by Proton rockets